This article lists notable SCPs.

Series 1

SCP-006 "Fountain of Youth" 

SCP-006 is a spring located near Astrakhan, in Russia. It was secured by the Foundation after the collapse of the Soviet Union. A chemical factory has been set up at the spot of the spring as a disguise. It grants the person who ingests it with cellular regenerative capabilities, and improves the health of humans in particular and higher primates in general.

SCP-999 "The Tickle Monster" 
SCP-999 is a gelatinous blob of orange slime, weighing about 54 kg. At rest, it assumes a shape of a dome roughly 1 metre in height and 2 metres in diameter.

References